The Edward Benjamin Dubuisson House, at 437 N. Court St. in Opelousas, Louisiana, was built in 1927.  It was listed on the National Register of Historic Places in 1997.

It is described as a "large two story frame residence built in a distinctly southern version of the Colonial Revival style."  It was designed by architect Herman Duncan and built by Homer Ventre.

The listing included a second contributing building, a carriage house which is older than the main house, built around 1915.

References

National Register of Historic Places in St. Landry Parish, Louisiana
Colonial Revival architecture in Louisiana
Houses completed in 1927
Houses in Louisiana